The 2017 UEFA European Under-21 Championship Final was a football match that took place on 30 June 2017 at the Stadion Cracovia in Kraków, Poland, to determine the winners of the 2017 UEFA European Under-21 Championship. The match was contested by Germany and Spain, the winners of the semi-finals.

Germany won the final 1–0 for their second UEFA European Under-21 Championship title.

Route to the final

Match

Details

Statistics

References

External links
Match press kits
Line-ups
Full-time report

Final
UEFA European Under-21 Championship finals
Germany national under-21 football team
Spain national under-21 football team
June 2017 sports events in Europe
Sports competitions in Kraków
21st century in Kraków
Germany–Spain relations